Nightmare Alley may refer to:

 Nightmare Alley (novel), a 1946 novel by William Lindsay Gresham
 Nightmare Alley (1947 film), a film noir, based on the novel
 Nightmare Alley (2021 film), a drama thriller film, a new adaptation of the novel